Smoking in Macau is regulated more strictly than in mainland China, but not to the extent of the regulation of smoking in Hong Kong.

In May 2009 the government of Macau Special Administrative Region (SAR) announced a planned indoor smoking ban for all public places, "to create a fair environment where smokers have the freedom to smoke and non-smokers also have the freedom not to inhale second-hand smoke," Health Bureau director Lei Chin Ion said. In April 2009 the government of Macau SAR announced proposed legislation that sought to raise the tobacco sales tax by 300%. Casinos and gambling are a major aspect of tourism in Macau. Smoking is banned on the main floors of casinos, but is permitted in closed-off ventilated smoking areas, which are located on the casino floors. A majority of Macau residents support a total ban on smoking in public places, but lawmakers in closed session on 20 April 2010 were unable to reach a consensus regarding a total ban inside casinos. The increasing number of smokers is a cause for concern, as 17% of people in Macau smoke.

See also
 Healthcare in Macau

References

Health in Macau
Macau